John Martin Sisk Jr. (December 11, 1906 – May 27, 1986) was a professional American football player who played running back for five seasons for the Chicago Bears.

References

External links

1906 births
1986 deaths
Players of American football from New Haven, Connecticut
American football running backs
Marquette Golden Avalanche football players
Chicago Bears players